Brachyglanis is a genus of Three-barbeled catfishes native to South America.

Species 
There are currently six recognized species in this genus:
Brachyglanis frenatus C. H. Eigenmann, 1912
Brachyglanis magoi Fernández-Yépez, 1967
Brachyglanis melas C. H. Eigenmann, 1912
Brachyglanis microphthalmus Bizerril, 1991
Brachyglanis nocturnus G. S. Myers, 1928
Brachyglanis phalacra C. H. Eigenmann, 1912

References

Heptapteridae
Fish of South America
Catfish genera
Taxa named by Carl H. Eigenmann
Freshwater fish genera